Georgia Steel (born 28 March 1998) is an English television personality. In 2018, she appeared on the fourth series of the ITV2 reality series Love Island. She has since made appearances in various reality television series including Celebs on the Ranch, Celebs Go Dating, Celebrity Coach Trip and Ex on the Beach: Peak of Love.

Early life
Steel was born on 28 March 1998 in Doncaster , South Yorkshire. As a child, she was diagnosed with dyslexia. Steel studied acting at the Academy of Live and Recorded Arts and worked part-time as a barmaid. She is also a trained dancer. When Steel was cast in Love Island, she took a break from drama school, but completed her training as an actress at St Mary's University in August 2019. Steel stated that before appearing on Love Island, she "was a student making dinner off £2".

Career
In 2013, Steel made her television debut in two episodes of the CBBC sitcom All at Sea, portraying the role of Amanda Bryce. In 2018, Steel appeared on the fourth series of the ITV2 reality series Love Island. She finished in eighth place alongside Sam Bird, after being eliminated on Day 47. In 2019, Steel appeared in the sixth series of the E4 dating reality series Celebs Go Dating. She also appeared in the 5Star reality series Celebs on the Ranch, which aired in April 2019. In 2019, she appeared in the fifth series of the E4 series Celebrity Coach Trip. From December 2019 to February 2020, she appeared on the MTV series Ex on the Beach: Peak of Love.

Filmography

References

External links
 

1998 births
Alumni of St Mary's University, Twickenham
Alumni of the Academy of Live and Recorded Arts
Living people
Participants in American reality television series
People educated at the Arts Educational Schools
People from Thirsk
Television presenters with dyslexia
Television personalities from Yorkshire
Love Island (2015 TV series) contestants